Harry Hallowes (born , died 2016), also known as Harry the Hermit, was an Irishman who became famous for living in a camp on Hampstead Heath in north London. When property developers tried to evict him, he successfully claimed adverse possession. After his death, a romantic comedy called Hampstead was made about his life.

Life 
Hallowes was born in County Sligo, Ireland, around 1936 and moved to London in the 1950s.  He was evicted from his council flat in Highgate in 1987 and then set up a makeshift camp in a corner of Hampstead Heath near Athlone House, supporting himself by doing odd jobs for locals such as the director Terry Gilliam.  When property developers tried to evict him, he successfully claimed title to the land by adverse possession having lived there for over 12 years.  He was awarded title to the half-acre plot of land in 2007.

Death 
Hallowes died in February 2016. Hallowes left the half-acre plot to two homelessness charities (Shelter and Centrepoint) and following his death the land was auctioned.   The plot sold for £154,000 which was significantly less than estimates that had been speculatively reported in the press. This was due to an agreement that is over 100 years old which prevents construction on the site.

Film 
In 2017, a romantic comedy called Hampstead was based on Hallowes' experience.  In the film, actor Brendan Gleeson played the part of a hermit on Hampstead Heath, who is befriended by an American widow played by Diane Keaton.

References 

English hermits
20th-century squatters
20th-century English people
2016 deaths
Irish emigrants to the United Kingdom
People from County Sligo
People from Hampstead
21st-century squatters